The Cliopsidae, common name sea angels, are a taxonomic family of small, free-swimming sea slugs, pelagic marine opisthobranch gastropod mollusks in the order Opisthobranchia.

As is the case in all gymnosome pteropods, these sea angels lack a shell except during an early embryonic stage.

The small lateral wing-like flaps (parapoda) are used in a slow swimming mode. The foot is reduced to three small median lobes.

Genera and species
Genera and species within the family Cliopsidae include:

Genus Cliopsis Troschel, 1854 
 Cliopsis krohnii Troschel, 1854 

Genus Pruvotella
 Pruvotella danae Pruvot-Fol, 1942
 Distribution : Bermuda, Oceanic
 Length : 10 mm

References